Víctor Rabuñal (born 8 January 1962) is a Uruguayan footballer. He played in four matches for the Uruguay national football team in 1983. He was also part of Uruguay's squad for the 1983 Copa América tournament.

References

1962 births
Living people
Uruguayan footballers
Uruguay international footballers
Place of birth missing (living people)
Association football midfielders